"2000 Mädchen" [2000 girls] is a punk song by Die Ärzte.  It was the third track and the second single from their 1987 album Ist das alles? (13 Höhepunkte mit den Ärzten). It's sung from the eyes of a telephone-stalker.

Track listing 

 "2000 Mädchen (Radio-Mix)" (Urlaub/Urlaub, Felsenheimer) - 3:31
 "Nein, nein, nein" (Urlaub/Felsenheimer) - 3:42

Maxi

 "2000 Mädchen (Wumme-Mix)" (Urlaub/Urlaub, Felsenheimer) - 5:55
 "Nein, nein, nein" (Urlaub/Felsenheimer) - 3:42
 "2000 Mädchen (Radio-Mix)" (Urlaub/Urlaub, Felsenheimer) - 3:31

B-sides
"Nein, nein, nein" [No, no, no] is one of many songs from the Gabi & Uwe series.

1987 singles
Die Ärzte songs
Songs written by Farin Urlaub
Songs written by Bela B.
1987 songs